Monroe Henry Kulp (October 23, 1858 – October 19, 1911) was a Republican member of the U.S. House of Representatives from Pennsylvania.

Early life
Kulp was born in Barto, Pennsylvania on October 23, 1858, the son of Darlington R. Kulp and Elizabeth (Gilbert) Kulp.  He attended the public schools of Shamokin, Pennsylvania, the State Normal College in Lebanon, Ohio, and graduated from Eastman Business College in Poughkeepsie, New York.

Career
After college, Kulp was engaged in the coal, lumber, brick, and ice businesses in Shamokin.  After having started in his father's businesses, Kulp organized several ventures of his own, often in partnership with his brother G. Gilbert Kulp and friend D. C. Kaseman, and their interests grew to include timber lands, railroads, residential and commercial real estate, and banks.  Kulp also became involved in several Shamokin area utilities, including the telephone, electricity, water, and sewer, and trolley companies.

Congressman
Kulp was elected as a Republican to the Fifty-fourth and Fifty-fifth Congresses.   He was not a candidate for renomination in 1898.  He was a delegate to the 1900 Republican National Convention.

Death and burial
Kulp suffered from Bright's disease, rheumatism, and other ailments.  He traveled extensively in an effort to regain his health, but was unsuccessful.  He died in Shamokin on October 19, 1911, just four days before his fifty-third birthday.  He was buried at Shamokin City Cemetery.

Family
In 1897, Kulp married Sara Washington Detweiler of Harrisburg, Pennsylvania.  They had no children.

References

Sources

Books

Newspapers

External links

The Political Graveyard

1858 births
1911 deaths
People from Berks County, Pennsylvania
National Normal University alumni
Republican Party members of the United States House of Representatives from Pennsylvania
19th-century American politicians